Thymic hypoplasia is a condition where the thymus is underdeveloped or involuted.

Causes
There are various causes of thymic hypoplasia such as 22q11.2 deletion syndrome,  CHARGE syndrome, Nude/SCID and otofaciocervical syndrome type 2 (OTFCS2), and ataxia telangiectasia.

References

External links 

Noninfectious immunodeficiency-related cutaneous conditions